St John's Roman Catholic High School is a secondary school in Dundee, Scotland. It was founded early in 1931 by the Marist Brothers, a religious congregation dedicated to education and under the patronage of the Virgin Mary. The school had eight houses named after abbeys in Scotland: Balmerino, Melrose, Jedburgh, Lindores, Paisley, Kelso, Iona and Dunkeld. In July 2011, the House system was streamlined to three: Dunkeld, Jedburgh, and Melrose.

As of 2018, the school has an enrolment of 1,030 students, and although Catholic in outlook, welcomes all religious backgrounds, and none.

History 

The Marist Brothers came to Dundee in 1860 and directed the three Roman Catholic primary schools in the city (St Andrew's, Our St Mary's Forebank, St Joseph's). At that time, Catholic secondary education was provided by the Sisters of Mercy at Lawside Academy for both boys and girls.

In 1916, the managers of the Dundee Catholic schools invited the Brothers to undertake the direction of a secondary school for boys in the city. It was proposed that alterations were made to the Brothers' house in Forebank and a new house built for them. This plan was agreed by the Provincial Council of the Brothers, and by 1918 everything was ready for the final steps to be taken. However, when the 1918 Education Act came into force, the diocesan schools were handed over to the local authorities, and the plans for a secondary school for boys came to naught.

In 1931, a new "Central School" was set up to take the boys and girls of post-primary age who did not continue to Lawside Academy. It was to replace the Supplementary Classes, or Advanced Division, which had been housed in the various primary schools. The new school was to be called St John's (after John the Apostle) and the Marist Brothers were asked to run the establishment. The new school was started in buildings in Park Place, which had recently been vacated by Harris Academy. Occasionally some classes took place in Artillery Lane and Daniel Street.

On 1 November 1967, 19-year-old Robert Mone entered a needlework class taken by teacher Nanette Hanson. He was armed with a shotgun and for  hours subjected the teacher and her pupils to a terrifying ordeal. It culminated in the murder of Hanson.

In 1978 two former pupils broke into the school and set fire to the main hall causing extensive damage. The hall was completely destroyed.

Developments 
 
On 15 November 2004, plans for a £11.5 million refurbishment and extension to the Harefield Road building were submitted to the Education Committee of Dundee City Council. Reconstruction took place between October 2004 and October 2006, with the work being carried out by Muirfield (Contracts) Ltd of Dundee. During this time, the school was decanted to the nearby former Rockwell High building on Lawton Road. The demolition of the 3 storey teaching block made way for the construction of a new four-storey building, which, apart from classrooms, also includes a 25-metre 5 lane swimming pool, fitness suite, games hall, community wing and dance studio. The new block contained classrooms for a number of subjects including English, Mathematics, Art, History, Religious Education, Modern Studies, Geography, Computing and Business Studies. Included was a new library, staff room, offices, drama studio and multi-purpose 'learning centre'. The block to the east of the new building was renamed the Iona block and was extensively refurbished and now contains the Science laboratories and the Home Economics rooms. The new building was officially re-opened by Cardinal O'Brien on 15 February 2007, with a final cost of £12.5 million.

In 2012, the school was selected as the Dundee base for the Scottish Football Association's Performance Schools, a system devised to support the development of the best young talented footballers across the country (there are seven such schools across Scotland). As of 2018, the dedicated coach for the young players at St John's is Iain Jenkins.

Notable former pupils 
 Ernie Ross (1942-2021), Labour politician
 Robert Mone (born 1948) spree killer
 David Narey (born 1956), footballer
 Jenny Marra (born 1977), politician
 Kieren Webster (born 1986), musician
 Kyle Falconer (born 1987), musician
 Scott Allardice (born 1998), footballer
 Logan Chalmers (born 2000), footballer

References 

Educational institutions established in 1931
Catholic secondary schools in Dundee
Youth football in Scotland
1931 establishments in Scotland